Mende Kikakui is a Unicode block containing the Kikakui characters for writing the Mende language.

History
The following Unicode-related documents record the purpose and process of defining specific characters in the Mende Kikakui block:

References 

Unicode blocks
Mende language